ML-191 was a British motor launch boat that disappeared in the North Sea while on passage from Norway.

Construction 
ML-191 was constructed in 1915 by the Electric Launch Company. She was completed in 1915 and she was named ML-191 and served from 1915 until her disappearance in 1919.

The ship was assessed at 37 disp and she had a diesel engine that could reach a speed of 19 knots.

Disappearance 
On 29 September 1919, ML-191 along with ML-18 and ML-62 were on passage from Norway when they disappeared in the North Sea. The crew and ships were never found, and the number of casualties is unknown.

References

1915 ships
Maritime incidents in 1919
Missing ships
Ships lost with all hands
Ships of the Royal Navy
Shipwrecks in the North Sea